The Baker Library/Bloomberg Center is a building complex at Harvard Business School on the campus of Harvard University in Boston, Massachusetts. It includes the Baker Library, built in 1927, and the Bloomberg Center, completed in 2005.

Overview

The construction of the Baker Library was completed in 1927. It was named for philanthropist George Fisher Baker. From 1930 to 2007, the bell in the tower came from the Danilov Monastery in Moscow, Russia; it had been donated by Charles Richard Crane.

The Bloomberg Center was built in 2003–2005. It was named for billionaire alumnus Michael R. Bloomberg's father, William Henry Bloomberg.

The complex includes 67 faculty offices, the de Gaspé Beaubien Reading Room, named for alumnus Philippe de Gaspé Beaubien, the Stamps Reading Room and the Frist Faculty Commons, named for philanthropist Thomas F. Frist Jr..

Architectural design
The 1927 building was designed in the Georgian Revival style by McKim, Mead & White. The 2005 expansion was designed by Robert A.M. Stern Architects.

Library collections

The library collections contain many rare books and documents of business history.

See also
Spangler Center

References

Robert A. M. Stern buildings
Harvard Business School
Library buildings completed in 1927
McKim, Mead & White buildings
Georgian Revival architecture in Massachusetts
Libraries in Massachusetts
Harvard University buildings
Business libraries